Zhang Yixing  (born ), known professionally as Lay Zhang or simply Lay, is a Chinese rapper, singer, songwriter, dancer, actor, and businessman. Zhang first gained recognition for participating in the Chinese television talent show Star Academy in 2005. He later debuted as a member of the South Korean-Chinese boy band Exo and its Chinese sub-unit Exo-M under SM Entertainment in 2012.

In 2015, Zhang founded a personal agency for his solo activities and music releases and released an autobiography titled Standing Firm at 24. In 2016, Zhang released his first extended play (EP), Lose Control, to commercial success. The EP peaked at number one on the Gaon Album Chart and number four on Billboards US World Albums chart. Since his debut as a solo artist, Zhang has released four EPs and four studio albums. He founded the Chromosome Entertainment Group, which began recruiting trainees worldwide, in 2020.

Zhang has been included on the Forbes China Celebrity 100 (placing in the top 20 in multiple years) and on the CelebrityZ Top 100 Most Valuable Celebrities list (placing 23rd in 2016) published by market research company Kantar and Chinese business magazine CBN Weekly. Outside of music, Zhang became the first celebrity to serve as publicity ambassador for the Communist Youth League of China of Changsha in 2016 and has also ventured into acting. He has starred in films and television shows such as Ex-Files 2 (2015), The Mystic Nine (2016), Kung Fu Yoga (2017), The Island (2018), The Golden Eyes (2019), Empress of the Ming (2019) and Crime Crackdown (2021).

Early life
Zhang Yixing was born Zhang Jiashuai (Chinese: 张加帅) in Changsha, Hunan, China on 7 October 1991. His legal name was later changed to Zhang Yixing. His first known acting role was at age six, starring as Huan Huan in the 1998 Chinese television drama We The People. In 2000, at age nine, Zhang participated in a Chinese television show as a fan club member of the Taiwanese singer and actor Jimmy Lin, Zhang's first contact with the entertainment industry. Zhang began became a local child star after winning third place in a competition organized by the Hunan-based television show Star Academy in 2005. He also appeared in an episode of Yue Ce Yue Xin Kai and Liu Na's variety show Na Ke Bu Yi Yang between 2005 and 2006. In April 2006, he auditioned for a leading part in Zhang Jizhong's The Duke of Mount Deer but did not win the role despite being a finalist.

In 2008, Zhang auditioned for SM Entertainment at the South Korean company's global casting audition in Wuhan. At the time, he was 16 years old and studying at the High School Attached to Hunan Normal University. After successfully passing the auditions, Zhang moved to South Korea to complete his idol training. In 2011, prior to his debut with Exo, he briefly worked with Shinee on their Shinee World Tour as Jonghyun's dance replacement.

Career

2012–2014: Debut with Exo 

Zhang debuted as a K-pop idol under the stage name "Lay", which he stated SM Entertainment gave him because there is a character named Huaze Lei who "is talented and likes music quite a bit" in the Taiwanese drama Meteor Garden. He was first unveiled as one of the four Chinese members of Exo in a teaser video titled "Phoenix" in January 2012.
Following the release of the singles "What Is Love" and "History" in 2012, he and the other eleven members held their pre-debut showcase in Seoul Olympic Stadium on 31 March 2012, as well as a second showcase and press conference at the Great Hall of the Beijing University of International Business and Economics. The group debuted on 8 April 2012 with the single "Mama", and Exo-M's first performance in China was publicly televised at the 12th Yinyue Fengyun Bang Awards.

In December 2012, Zhang was featured in SM Entertainment's project dance group SM the Performance alongside fellow Exo member Kai and labelmates Yunho, Eunhyuk, Donghae, Minho and Taemin. On 29 December, the group performed their single "Spectrum", which was released the following day, at the 2012 SBS Gayo Daejeon. As Exo attained domestic stardom, their studio album XOXO became the first to sell more than one million copies in South Korea in 12 years.
Additionally, their 2014 EP Overdose entered US Billboard 200 chart.

Early in 2014, Zhang composed and performed the song "I'm Lay" for his solo performance during Exo's first headlining concert tour, The Lost Planet. Later that year, he performed another self-composed song, "I'm Coming", on a special year-end television program on Hunan TV. Zhang also composed the song "Promise" on the repackaged edition of Exo's second studio album, Love Me Right, and wrote the lyrics for the Chinese version of the song.

2014–2015: Solo activities and film debut 
In August 2014, Zhang joined his first variety show, Star Chef, as a cast member.
In April 2015, SM Entertainment announced that a personal studio had been established for Zhang's activities in China. In May 2015, he became a regular cast member of the Chinese reality television show Go Fighting!. Zhang subsequently starred in the second, third, and fourth seasons of the show, which helped increased his popularity in China.

On 18 September, the limited edition of Zhang's autobiography Standing Firm at 24 was published, while the standard edition became available on 7 October. The book documented important events throughout his life and broke several online sales records, selling 68,537 copies in the first 24 minutes of pre-sales. Zhang placed fourth on the 10th Chinese Celebrity Writers List, the youngest celebrity author to enter the chart. He was first place in the 2015 installment of the Annual Celebrity Book Sales and ranked first Asia's Best Books twice on its monthly chart and six times on its weekly charts. Zhang's autobriography made Rakuten's lists, with 400,000 copies sold in six months.

In November 2015, Zhang made his film debut with a supporting role in the Chinese romantic comedy movie Ex-Files 2: The Backup Strikes Back, which was a box office hit. He later won the Best Supporting Actor Award at the 2016 China Britain Film Festival for his performance. He also wrote and recorded an original soundtrack for the movie titled "Alone (One Person)", which reached number one on the Baidu Music Chart and later won Best Movie Original Soundtrack awards at the 16th Top Chinese Music Awards and 4th V-Chart Awards. Zhang also starred in the Chinese comedy film Oh My God and collaborated with his co-stars Coco Jiang Wen and Li Xiaolu on an original soundtrack for the movie titled "Happy Youth", which debuted at number eight on the Billboard V Chart.

2016: Rising popularity and solo debut
In January 2016, Zhang and the other cast members of Go Fighting! appeared in the Chinese movie Royal Treasure. In April 2016, he received the Most Popular Newcomer award at the 16th Top Chinese Music Awards.

In May 2016, Zhang made his small screen debut in the Chinese television series To Be A Better Man. Written by Lay and co-composed and arranged with Divine Channel, "Monodrama" broke records by staying at number one on YinYueTai's V Chart for five consecutive weeks.
In July 2016, Zhang starred in the Chinese action mystery drama The Mystic Nine, a prequel to The Lost Tomb. The series achieved domestic success, placing first in television ratings and setting a record for the most online views garnered in a day. It has since accumulated over 12 billion total views. Zhang went on to star in a spin-off of the television series titled The Mystic Nine Side Story: Flowers Bloom in February, which focused solely on Zhang's character. Flowers Bloom in February was also successful, accumulating over 500 million views.

In October 2016, Zhang made his debut as a solo artist with the release of "What U Need?" as a surprise gift for his fans on his birthday. The song reached number four spot on the China V Chart and Billboard World Digital Songs chart. He performed it for the first time on 10 October at the 2016 Asia Song Festival in Busan, South Korea.

On 28 October, Zhang released his debut extended play (EP) Lose Control, which contained six Mandarin tracks and the music video for the title song.
Lay was involved in much of the production of the EP, participating in songwriting and arrangement as well as translating the original lyrics himself into English, Korean and Japanese.
The song "Lose Control" stayed as number one on Billboard's China V Chart for six consecutive weeks. Pre-orders for Lose Control surpassed 200,000 copies, and it debut at number one on the Gaon Album Chart. It also reached number four on Billboard's US World Albums chart. Zhang performed "Lose Control" for the first time on the music program The Show on 15 November.

2017: Mainstream success 
On 27 January 2017, Zhang made his maiden appearance on CCTV Spring Gala Festival and sang a duet alongside Chinese actor Jing Boran.
The same month, he starred with Jackie Chan in the Indian-Chinese action film Kung Fu Yoga directed by Stanley Tong, playing an archaeologist assistant. The film grossed $245.2 million, the highest-grossing comedy film in China at the time. A post-release music video of "Goosebump" sung by Fazilpuria featured him and Jackie Chan.

On 17 February, Zhang made his last public appearance with Exo on the Hong Kong concerts of their world tour Exo Planet 3 – The Exo'rdium. Afterwards, he halted activities with the group due to overlapping schedules with his solo career in mainland China. In April, Zhang starred in the Chinese patriotic film The Founding of an Army and was praised for his portrayal of Lu Deming. Later in April, Zhang starred in the Chinese remake of the hit Japanese romance television series Operation Love. He composed and performed the song "Pray" for the drama. In July, Zhang voiced Jackson Storm in the Chinese-dubbed version of Disney's animated film Cars 3.

On 25 September, Zhang released the music video for "I Need U", a pre-release track from his album Lay 02 Sheep. The music video ranked number one on Billboard's China Weibo Live Chart. The album was released on 7 October along with the music video for the song "Sheep". On its first day of digital sales, the album broke five records on QQ Music for the Gold, Double Gold, Triple Gold, Platinum and Diamond (¥5 million in 9 hours 11 minutes) certifications. The album premiere 2017 Zhang Yixing Showcase was held at the Beijing National Aquatics Center on 12 October, where he performed "I Need U", "Sheep" and other singles. In October, Zhang was announced to be starring as the male lead alongside label-mate Krystal Jung in the South Korean-Chinese romance film Unexpected Love, the poster for which was revealed in the Cannes Film Festival.

On 22 December, Zhang released his second EP Winter Special Gift on QQ Music and KuGou. The music video of the lead single for the album, "Goodbye Christmas", was released on the same day. Within one day of digital sales, the album surpassed Gold, Double Gold, Triple Gold and Platinum sales marks on QQ Music. The album later surpassed the Diamond sales mark on the platform as well. The same month, Zhang was appointed as the presenter and production director of iQiyi's hit talent recruiting program Idol Producer.

2018: Debut in the United States 

On 1 April 2018, Zhang returned as one of the main cast in the fourth season of hit Chinese variety show Go Fighting!. He attended the 2018 CCTV New Year's Gala, where he performed a dance in collaboration with Huang Bo and William Chan. He also participated in the national anthem and its music video for Youth Day in China in May. In July, Zhang made a guest appearance for the web series The Tomb of Sea, where he portrayed a descendant of his character from the hit 2016 TV series The Mystic Nine. In August, Zhang starred in Huang Bo's commercially and critically successful directorial debut film The Island, where he received acclaim for his performance.

Zhang made his first appearance in the US at the music festival Lollapalooza, where he collaborated with DJ Alan Walker. The duo later collaborated on a remixed version of Zhang's previous single "Sheep", titled "Sheep Relift" and released on 30 August.

Zhang's second album Namanana was released on 19 October, with the pre-release single "Give Me a Chance" released on 5 October. The album contained 22 songs, including a collaboration with American singer Bazzi, 11 of which are in the Chinese language with English versions of each. Namanana debuted at number 21 on Billboard 200, making Lay the highest ranked Mandopop artist on the chart. The album also placed first on the World Albums and Independent Albums charts.

On 24 December, Lay released a Christmas-themed digital single titled "When It's Christmas". The same month, he joined Chinese EDM talent show Rave Now as a mentor alongside Alan Walker.

2019–present: Continued success and Chromosome Entertainment Group 
On 20 January, Zhang attended a Samsung event at the Mercedes-Benz Arena in Shanghai as the ambassador of Samsung Galaxy A8s and performed on-stage alongside ASAP Ferg and Steve Aoki, respectively. That month, Zhang returned as the production director and presenter of the Chinese survival show Idol Producer 2. On 3 February, Zhang performed a Chinese New Year song with Dilraba Dilmurat, Phoenix Legend, Wallace Chung, and Zhou Dongyu at the 2019 CCTV New Year's Gala.

Zhang attended the 61st Annual Grammy Awards as its promotional ambassador on 10 February, the only Chinese celebrity invited to the red carpet event and live ceremony. On 26 February, a Michael Jackson tribute song titled "Let's Shut Up & Dance" was released by Zhang in collaboration with American singer Jason Derulo and K-pop group and SM Entertainment labelmate NCT 127. That same month, a third wax figure of Zhang was revealed in Madame Tussauds Hong Kong, following wax figures in Madame Tussauds Shanghai and Beijing. Zhang also starred as the protagonist in the Chinese fantasy-adventure series The Golden Eyes, which aired on iQiyi from 26 February to 12 April 2019. On 15 March, Zhang released a digital single titled "Lovebird" as a collaborative song with American EDM and hip-hop group Far East Movement. On 6 May, Zhang made his first appearance at the annual fashion exhibition Met Gala in New York City as an ambassador for Valentino, wearing a custom-made suit called "Time Traveller" designed by the house's creative director Pierpaolo Piccioli.

Zhang appeared as Emperor Yingzong of Ming in the historical drama Empress of the Ming in 2019. On 14 June, Zhang released a digital EP titled Honey and its title track of the same name. The EP sold over 1.87 million digital copies three minutes after release on QQ Music, breaking his personal record for Namanana. It also earned QQ Music's Golden Hall status for surpassing nine sales levels and earning the Gold Diamond certification. Zhang embarked on his first international concert tour, Grand Line, in July 2019. Tickets for the concert at the Mercedes-Benz Arena in Shanghai sold out in eight seconds, while tickets for the Nanjing show sold out in twenty-five seconds. He also performed in Bangkok, Thailand. In December 2019, Zhang released the single "Grandmother (外婆)", which served as a tribute to his grandmother who had passed away earlier in the year.

On 19 March 2020, Lay Zhang released the song "Love You More" with artists Steve Aoki and Will.i.am and featuring Jessica Carrie Lee as part of Aoki's Neon Future IV album.

On 1 June 2020, Zhang released the first part of his fourth album, Lit; the second part was released on 21 July 2020. In June 2020, Zhang won the competition of iQiyi's I'm a Singer-Songwriter 2. He also appeared as a producer mentor on Youku's We are Young. In August 2020, Zhang started appearing as a mentor and captain in the third season of the Chinese dance survival show Street Dance of China. He also filmed for the drama Challenges at Midlife.

On 7 October 2020, Zhang officially announced the establishment of his entertainment company, Chromosome Entertainment Group. Through its official accounts on Twitter, Weibo, and Instagram, the company revealed a trainee selection program modeled after the one Zhang participated in under SM Entertainment. Several celebrities expressed their congratulatory remarks to Zhang's new venture, including the founder and former CEO of SM Entertainment, Lee Soo-man.

Lay released his fourth studio album, Producer, on 5 February 2021, with lead single "Joker" released four days prior. The album featured studio versions of the songs he composed for his appearance in the second season of I'm a Singer-Songwriter.

On 7 June 2021, after a three-year absence from Exo, Lay appeared in their mini-album Don't Fight the Feeling.

On 7 October 2021, Lay released the single "Samadhi Real Fire", the pre-release single for his new EP East, which was released on 15 October.

On 8 April 2022, Lay released the song "酒(JIU)" in celebration of EXO 10th Year Debut Anniversary.  Also announced later that day, he would be departing from SM Entertainment after the conclusion of his ten-year contract with the company. 

On 21 September 2022, Lay released the music video for the song "Veil", the title track of his EP West (西) that he released five days later on 26 September 2022.

Artistry

Songwriting 
Zhang has composed and produced numerous songs, including "Exo 2014" by Exo and the tracks on each of his solo albums Lose Control, Lay 02 Sheep, Winter Special Gift and Namanana. He also wrote and composed his 2015 SM Station single "Monodrama". Zhang composed "Alone", the original soundtrack for his 2015 romantic-comedy film Ex-Files 2, as well as "Prayer", for his 2017 Chinese web-drama Operation Love. He also helped compose the songs "Not to be Continued" by Chinese singer Karen Mok, which was released in May 2018 for her 25th anniversary album, and MC Jin's single "Debut" in the same year. Zhang has also written songs for Yu Quan and Show Luo. In April 2018, Zhang won the Best Producer award at the Chinese Top Ten Music Awards, revealing in an interview that at one point he lost over 99 unreleased self-composed tracks.

Musical style 
Many of Zhang's released songs contain elements of traditional Chinese music, such as the instruments hulusi, guzheng and gong. Zhang mentioned in an interviews that he considers his main genre to be M-pop, which stands for "Mix Mandarin popular music" and blends different languages. One example is his collaborative single with American EDM and hip-hop group Far East Movement titled "Lovebird", which contains both the English and Mandarin languages. "The Assembly Call", the opening track of his 2018 album Namanana, is an instrumental that showcases different traditional Chinese sounds and music.

Zhang has frequently been associated with his Chinese zodiac sign, the sheep, which he has used throughout his solo career and most notably on his 2017 solo album Lay 02 Sheep and its lead single "Sheep". He has been nicknamed "little sheep" in China by fans and media.

Personal life
In his autobiography, Standing Firm at 24, Zhang revealed that he struggled with anxiety when performing on stage but was able to face his fears and overcome them through his dedication to training and working hard alongside the rest of the members of Exo. He also revealed that while he had received some formal instruction in learning the guitar and piano, he was mostly self-taught.

Zhang supports the One China policy and "is against any acts or words that split his country." In August 2019, during the 2019–20 Hong Kong protests, Zhang expressed support for the Hong Kong police and declared himself "one of 1.4 billion guardians of the Chinese flag" on his official Weibo account.

Other activities

Endorsements and partnerships

Zhang has had tie-ins with over 30 companies, including Converse, MAC Cosmetics, Chaumet Paris, Ray-Ban, Milka Chocolate, H&M and Perrier; as a result, he has topped lists of K-pop idols with the most endorsement deals. He was Calvin Klein's first Chinese global spokesperson for their underwear and jean lines. Additionally, as an ambassador of high-end fashion house Valentino, Zhang attended multiple fashion shows and events in Asia and Europe, as well at the annual Met Gala. He has also served as a promotional ambassador for Huawei Nova from 2015 to 2018.

In July 2016, Zhang was appointed by the Communist Youth League of China of Changsha as its publicity ambassador, the first celebrity to hold such title. Since then, he has served as publicity ambassador for three consecutive years.

In October 2017, Zhang signed a contract with the vice president of Tencent Music Entertainment Group and became a member of "Music+ Plan" (Music+ 计划) alongside TFBoys, Wang Leehom and more. In September 2018, Zhang signed an agreement with Easy Entertainment in which his personal studio will collaborate with Easy Entertainment to create a new team to manage Zhang's promotional activities.

In 2019, Zhang pulled out from an endorsement contract with Samsung Electronics because the tech giant allegedly listed Hong Kong and Taiwan as separate countries on their website, violating the One China policy. Zhang's Chinese management company released the following statement: "Samsung has severely offended the national feelings of our Chinese compatriots by being ambiguous about the integrity of our sovereignty and territory. We would like to express our regret, but we will not tolerate this."

Philanthropy 
In February 2015, Zhang participated in the "Return Home with Love for A Thousand Miles", a large-scale public welfare activities and volunteer project. The project included on-site delivery of relief supplies to labour workers which helps them return home faster and to help labour workers in a timely manner to reinforce physical safety. On 2 May, Zhang established his own foundation entitled, "Zhang Yixing Arts Scholarship" on behalf of providing scholarship for his alma mater middle school, Hunan Masters College Middle School where he will donate 100 thousand yuan annually. His intentions were encourage talented youth to pursue their dreams.
On 7 September, Zhang responded to a campus soccer public welfare project, "Summit of Hope" ("希望之颠"). He uploaded a video on his Weibo account in an attempt to publicise the project.

On 1 February 2016, Zhang donated an undisclosed amount to a joint Weibo public welfare funding project (#一起9加1#) which aids impoverished families for the upcoming Lunar New Year. In March 2016, during the second season of Go Fighting!, Zhang and the other cast members visited a community-run migrant worker dependent school located in Chuansha Xin Town of Shanghai as part of the "Go Fighting Welfare Development Project" ("极限公益成长计划"). The initiative donated more than 1.2 million yuan worth of materials for over 12 schools nationwide. On 1 May, Zhang participated in the Youku "Go Fighting Minute Challenge" public welfare project on Weibo where he sent greetings to as many friends and families as possible in one minute and urged the public to express positive energy and to donate to charity. He donated another 1 million yuan and a piano to his alma mater. Later that year, in conjunction with the 10th anniversary of his alma mater, Zhang once more donated another 1 million yuan to his scholarship foundation. On 2 July, Zhang was honorably appointed as the Publicity Ambassador of the Communist Youth League of China (CYLC), expressed that he will dedicate himself to his appointment and appealed to the public to do charity through singing the national anthem. On 9 September, Zhang attended the 2016 BAZAAR Stars' Charity Night which resulted in him donating 10 ambulances with worth amounting to 700 thousand yuan. Due to his charitable contributions, Zhang was ranked number 15th by the China Philanthropist Magazine in the '2016 China's Top Philanthropist Celebrity List'.

On 9 September 2017, Zhang attended the 2017 BAZAAR Stars' Charity Night and donated 15 ambulances, valued at 1.05 million yuan. In January 2018, he starred in a public welfare movie I'm Beside You, in which he sang and composed the theme song. On 30 March 2018, he starred as a guest recitalist in CCTV's Trust in China talk show. Zhang ranked number 18 by the China Philanthropist Magazine in the 2017 China's Top Philanthropist Celebrity List. In January 2018, Zhang participated as a cameo in the campaign movie For Love With You; the theme song of the movie, I'm By Your Side, was sung by Zhang.

Discography

 Lay 02 Sheep (2017)
 Namanana (2018)
 Lit (2020)
 Producer (2021)

Filmography

Film

Television series

Variety shows

Tours 

 Grand Line: The First Concert (2019)
 Grand Line 2: Infinite Lands (2022)

Awards and achievements

Forbes China Celebrity 100

Bibliography

References

External links

 
 
 

1991 births
Living people
Chinese contemporary R&B singers
Chinese dance music singers
Chinese expatriates in South Korea
Chinese male dancers
Chinese male film actors
Chinese male television actors
Chinese Mandopop singers
Chinese K-pop singers
Chinese pop singers
Chinese male singer-songwriters
Chinese tenors
English-language singers from China
Exo members
Korean-language singers of China
Male actors from Changsha
Musicians from Changsha
SM Entertainment artists